Charles James Koch (born May 27, 1949) is an American entrepreneur, billionaire, and the co-founder and chairman of the Boston Beer Company, the producers of Samuel Adams beer. Koch is widely considered to be the founding father of the American craft brewing movement.

Early life
Koch was born in Cincinnati on May 27, 1949, one of four children born to German-American parents Charles and Dorothy Koch (née Kautz). Charles was a fifth-generation brewer. Koch earned a Bachelor of Arts, Juris Doctor, and Master of Business Administration from Harvard University.

Career
He is a former consultant with The Boston Consulting Group. He was formerly an Outward Bound instructor. In 1984, Koch co-founded the Boston Beer Company, the producers of Samuel Adams beer.

Koch took Boston Beer company public in 1995 and owns a 26% stake in the company, giving him a net-worth of over $2.4 billion. He is currently ranked #925 in Forbes Billionaires 2021.

In 2016, Koch published Quench Your Own Thirst: Business Lessons Learned Over a Beer or Two, in which he discussed how he left his career as a management consultant to start his own brewery using his great-great-grandfather's recipe.

In August 2018, Koch said the corporate tax cut of 2017 helped to play a major role in making Boston Beer Company more competitive in regard to foreign competitors. Koch stated that "When I started Sam Adams, American beer was a joke, and it pissed me off. And now, American brewers make the best beer in the world. And the tax reform was a very big deal for all of us, because 85 percent of the beer made in the United States is owned by foreign companies."

Personal life
Koch's marriage to his first wife, Susan, ended around the time he started the Boston Beer Company.
He remarried to entrepreneur Cynthia Fisher in 1994. He has two children from his first marriage and two from his second. They live in Newton, Massachusetts.

Koch is unrelated to Stone Brewing Co. cofounder Greg Koch.

Works cited

References

Sources

 
 
 
 

Living people
American brewers
Harvard Business School alumni
Harvard Law School alumni
1949 births